Chantal de Bruijn (born 13 February 1976) is a Dutch field hockey defender who has played for Dutch clubs Shinty, SV Kampong and  Amsterdam. She made her debut for the Netherlands national team on 21 August 2001 against New Zealand. De Bruijn was a member of the Dutch squad that won the silver medal at the 2004 Summer Olympics in Athens. She was also part of the Dutch squad that became world champions at the 2006 Women's Hockey World Cup.

References

External links
 

1976 births
Living people
Dutch female field hockey players
Field hockey players at the 2004 Summer Olympics
Medalists at the 2004 Summer Olympics
Olympic field hockey players of the Netherlands
Olympic medalists in field hockey
Olympic silver medalists for the Netherlands
People from Schoonhoven
LGBT field hockey players
Reading Hockey Club players
SV Kampong players
21st-century Dutch LGBT people
Sportspeople from South Holland